In statistical mechanics, the Darwin–Fowler method is used for deriving the distribution functions with mean probability. It was developed by Charles Galton Darwin and Ralph H. Fowler in 1922–1923.

Distribution functions are used in statistical physics to estimate the mean number of particles occupying an energy level (hence also called occupation numbers). These distributions are mostly derived as those numbers for which the system under consideration is in its state of maximum probability. But one really requires average numbers. These average numbers can be obtained by the Darwin–Fowler method. Of course, for systems in the thermodynamic limit (large number of particles), as in statistical mechanics, the results are the same as with maximization.

Darwin–Fowler method

In most texts on statistical mechanics the statistical distribution functions  in Maxwell–Boltzmann statistics, Bose–Einstein statistics, Fermi–Dirac statistics) are derived by determining those for which the system is in its state of maximum probability. But one really requires those with average or mean probability, although – of course – the results are usually the same for systems with a huge number of elements, as is the case in statistical mechanics. The method for deriving the distribution functions with mean probability has been developed by C. G. Darwin and Fowler and is therefore known as the Darwin–Fowler method. This method is the most reliable general procedure for deriving statistical distribution functions. Since the method employs a selector variable (a factor introduced for each element to permit a counting procedure) the method is also known as the Darwin–Fowler method of selector variables. Note that a distribution function is not the same as the probability – cf. Maxwell–Boltzmann distribution, Bose–Einstein distribution, Fermi–Dirac distribution.

The Darwin–Fowler method has been treated in the texts of E. Schrödinger, Fowler and Fowler and E. A. Guggenheim, of K. Huang, and of H. J. W. Müller–Kirsten.

Classical statistics

The average over all arrangements is the mean occupation number

Insert a selector variable  by setting

In classical statistics the  elements are (a) distinguishable and can be arranged with packets of  elements on level  whose number is 

so that in this case

Allowing for (b) the degeneracy  of level  this expression becomes

Thus

and hence

This result which agrees with the most probable value obtained by maximization does not involve a single approximation and is therefore exact, and thus demonstrates the power of this Darwin–Fowler method.

Quantum statistics
We have as above

where  is the number of elements in energy level . Since in quantum statistics elements are indistinguishable no preliminary calculation of the number of ways of dividing elements into packets  is required.

In the case of Fermi–Dirac statistics we have
  or 
per state. There are  states for energy level .
Hence we have

In the case of Bose–Einstein statistics we have

By the same procedure as before we obtain in the present case

But

Therefore

where the upper signs apply to Fermi–Dirac statistics, and the lower signs to Bose–Einstein statistics.

In the case of a function  which can be expanded as

We note that similarly the coefficient  in the above can be obtained as

where

Differentiating one obtains

and

This method of evaluation of  around the saddle point is known as the method of steepest descent. One then obtains

We have  and hence

(the +1 being negligible since  is large). We shall see in a moment that this last relation is simply the formula

We obtain the mean occupation number  by evaluating

For the relation to be reliable one should check that higher order contributions are initially decreasing in magnitude so that the expansion around the saddle point does indeed yield an asymptotic expansion.

Further reading

References

Statistical mechanics